"The Vale of Lost Women" is a fantasy short story by American author Robert E. Howard. It is one of his original short stories about Conan the Cimmerian that was not published during his lifetime. The Magazine of Horror first published the story in its Spring, 1967 issue. It was republished in the collection Conan of Cimmeria (Lancer Books, 1967). It has also been republished in the collections The Conan Chronicles Volume 1: The People of the Black Circle (Gollancz, 2000) and Conan of Cimmeria: Volume One (1932-1933) (Del Rey, 2003). Set in the pseudo-historical Hyborian Age, "The Vale of Lost Women" details Conan's rescue of a female Ophirean captive from the Bakalah tribe, on the (apparent) condition that he will receive sexual favors in return for his generosity.

Plot summary 
The Bakalah tribe holds Livia, a soft and civilized woman, captive. They capture Livia and her younger brother Theteles when the two were traveling across a remote jungle, and eventually the natives torture Theteles to death. Conan appears as the leader of the Bamulas, a rival tribe. He negotiates a possible truce with the Bakalah and plans for a joint attack on Jihiji. After realizing Conan is white and may feel some kinship towards her, Livia asks him for his help. When Conan rejects her proposal, Livia offers herself to him as a reward for rescuing her.

Keeping his end of the bargain, Conan and his warriors attack the Bakalahs in the middle of their celebratory feast. He beheads their chief. The resulting carnage pushes the Livia to her breaking point. When she sees Conan drenched in blood walking toward her hut, carrying the chief's head, she believes he is coming to claim his reward. Frightened, she breaks their agreement by fleeing on horseback into the nearby jungle.

After escaping from the village, her horse stumbles, and Livia is thrown onto the ground. Unharmed, she descends into a valley filled with orchids. The valley is also inhabited by a tribe of brown-skinned lesbians. Believing she has found shelter from the blood-soaked "male brutality" of her Cimmerian savior, Livia feels safe amid the eerie beauty of her surroundings. Mesmerized by the hallucinogenic scent of a native flower, Livia barely notices she's being led to an altar-like section of the glade, where she is to be sacrificed to a bat-like entity, a "devil from the Outer Dark".

Conan, having pursued Livia and heard her cries for help, rushes to her aid. Conan drives away the bat-like creature. Conan tells Livia that he regrets the "foul bargain" he made with her and has no intention of forcing her to have sex, which in his view would have been as damnable an action as raping her. Since he believes Livia is not brave enough to survive within the Black Kingdoms, Conan tells her he will guide her to the Stygian borders where they will send her home to Ophir. Embarrassed by her grateful reaction, he tells Livia she is too soft to be "the proper woman for the war chief of the Bamulas".

Reception
James Van Hise, reviewing "The Vale of Lost Women", stated ""The Vale of Lost Women" is a minor effort", and added "it has more the air of a Conan pastiche than it does of Howard's more polished and well thought out tales."

Adaptation
Marvel Comics' 1970s Conan the Barbarian comic spent a long time detailing and adding to Conan's adventures on the Black Coast. Conan joins the Bamulas in #101, with the "Vale of Lost Women" finally adapted in #104.

References

External links

 Conan the Barbarian at AmratheLion.com
 Conan.com: The Official Website

1967 short stories
Conan the Barbarian stories by Robert E. Howard
Pulp stories
Cthulhu Mythos short stories
Fantasy short stories
Works originally published in American magazines
Works originally published in horror fiction magazines
Works originally published in pulp magazines
Short stories published posthumously